Grimspound is the tenth studio album by the English progressive rock band Big Big Train. Released on 28 April 2017, it was recorded at English Electric Studios, produced by Big Big Train, and mixed and mastered at Aubitt Studios by Rob Aubrey.

Following the release of their previous album, Folklore, the band had planned to release an EP called Skylon that would contain a handful of songs not completed in time to be included on that album. During the recording sessions to finish off the songs the band realised that they had enough material for a full album, deciding to release it as Grimspound. Grimspound is intended to be a companion release to Folklore and features a guest appearance from former Fairport Convention singer Judy Dyble. Upon release it entered the UK music charts at position 45, the band's first time placing in the official charts.

Track listing

Charts

Personnel
Big Big Train
 Nick D'Virgilio – drums, percussion, backing vocals, co-lead vocals on "A Mead Hall in Winter"
 Dave Gregory – electric guitars
 Rachel Hall – violin, viola, cello, backing vocals, co-lead vocals on "As the Crow Flies"
 David Longdon – lead and backing vocals, flute, piano, electric guitars, mandolin, banjo, lute, celesta, synthesisers, percussion
 Danny Manners – keyboards, double bass
 Andy Poole – acoustic guitar, keyboards, backing vocals
 Rikard Sjöblom – electric guitars, backing vocals, keyboards on "The Ivy Gate"
 Greg Spawton – bass guitar, bass pedals

Additional musicians
 Judy Dyble – vocals (on "The Ivy Gate")
 Philip Trzebiatowski – cello (on "On the Racing Line")

Production
 Rob Aubrey – mixing, mastering
 Rachel Hall – string arrangements

References

Big Big Train albums
2017 albums